The University of Pharmacy, Yangon, located in North Okkalapa, Yangon, is one of two pharmacy schools in Myanmar. 
The university offers Bachelor of Pharmacy (BPharm) and Master of Pharmacy (MPharm)and phD degree programs. 
The university accepts approximately 150 students annually based solely on their University Entrance Examination scores.

Programs
The university is one of the two pharmacy universities in Myanmar that offers undergraduate, graduate and doctoral degrees.

 Bachelor of pharmacy (B.pharm.)
- 4 years course
 Master of pharmacy (M.pharm.)

 Doctor of philosophy in pharmacy (Ph.D)

See also
 University of Pharmacy, Mandalay
List of universities in Myanmar

References

Universities and colleges in Yangon
Medical schools in Myanmar
Universities and colleges in Myanmar
Educational institutions established in 1992
1992 establishments in Myanmar